The  is a tolled expressway that connects Okayama and Kagawa prefectures in Japan across a series of five small islands in the Seto Inland Sea. Built between 1978 and 1988, it is one of the three routes of the Honshu-Shikoku Bridge Expressway Company connecting Honshū and Shikoku islands. The route is signed E30 under Ministry of Land, Infrastructure, Transport and Tourism's  "2016 Proposal for Realization of Expressway Numbering."

Route description

The expressway has four lanes along the entire route from Sakaide, Kagawa to Kurashiki in Okayama. 
The speed limit is 100 km/h from the expressway's northern terminus at Hayashima Interchange in Kurashiki to Kojima Interchange, also in Kurashiki. The southern remainder of the route has a speed limit set at 80 km/h.

Junction list
TB= Toll booth, SA= Service Area, PA= Parking Area

|colspan="8" style="text-align: center;"|Through to  San'yō Expressway

|colspan="8" style="text-align: center;"|Through to  Takamatsu Expressway

See also

Japan National Route 30

References

External links

Honshu-Shikoku Bridge Expressway Company Limited: E30 SETO CHUO EXPWY

Expressways in Japan
Roads in Kagawa Prefecture
Roads in Okayama Prefecture